Pearl City is a neighborhood in Boca Raton, Florida, immediately north of downtown.  The neighborhood was originally platted on May 30, 1915 for the blue-collar African Americans employed at the Boca Raton Resort and similar establishments, on area farms, in construction, and various other jobs.

There is little evidence on the origin of the name, but it is often theorized that Pearl City was named after the Hawaiian pearl pineapple, a major crop grown in the area at the time.

Crime
Pearl City, and the adjourning community of Lincoln Court, as well as the Dixie Manor housing projects (a property of the Boca Raton Housing Authority), are classified as low-income because of the high levels of poverty. The Boca Raton Police Department held an investigation in the 1980s, after identifying the area as a place of communal crack cocaine use.

Revitalization
The neighborhood was designated a historic district by the decree of the Boca Raton City Council in 2002.   Streets had also been resurfaced with asphalt after decades of neglect and deterioration.

There is a Dr. Martin Luther King Jr. Memorial, set in a small park on the grounds of Ebenezer Baptist Church, at the northeast corner of the  Pearl City neighborhood.

References

External links
Boca Raton Historical Society: Pearl City

Boca Raton, Florida
Neighborhoods in Florida
Populated places established in 1915
African-American history of Florida